Doug Wark (born December 24, 1951) is a former Scottish-American soccer forward who spent five seasons in the North American Soccer League and three in the Major Indoor Soccer League.  He earned one cap with the U.S. national team in 1975.

Wark grew up in Teaneck, New Jersey where he attended Teaneck High School, graduating in 1970.

College
Wark attended Mitchell College and then transferred to Hartwick College where he played two seasons of soccer in 1972 and 1973.  He earned second-team All-American recognition in 1973 as Hartwick went to the NCAA quarterfinals.  Inducted into the Hartwick Athletic Hall of Fame on September 30, 1995.

Professional
Wark left Hartwick after his sophomore season to sign with the Rochester Lancers of the North American Soccer League (NASL).  He spent only one season in Rochester before being traded to the Tampa Bay Rowdies before the 1975 indoor season.  The Rowdies then traded him to the San Diego Jaws four games into the 1976 season.  In 1977, the Jaws moved to Las Vegas where they were renamed the Las Vegas Quicksilvers.  After the 1977 season, the team was back in San Diego, now known as the San Diego Sockers.  He again began the season with one team only to be traded by the Sockers to the San Jose Earthquakes during the 1978 season.  After only eight games in San Jose, and he was again traded, this time to the Chicago Sting.  He finished the 1978 NASL season in Chicago, then left the league.  During the NASL's 1975 indoor tournament Wark scored three goals in the Regionals, and seven goals in the Championship rounds, making him the tournament's second leading scorer behind Paul Child. Wark was selected to the 1975 indoor all-tournament team.

When Wark left the NASL following the 1978 season, he signed with the Cincinnati Kids of Major Indoor Soccer League for the inaugural MISL season.  He scored twenty-nine goals in twenty-two games.  He returned to the Rowdies to play in the 1979–80 indoor season. He began the 1980–81 season with the Baltimore Blast but moved to the San Francisco Fog after two games.

National team
Wark earned one cap with the U.S. national team in a June 24, 1975 loss to Poland.  He started the game, then came off in the 84th minute for Kevin Welsh.

See also
List of United States men's international soccer players born outside the United States

External links
 NASL/MISL Stats

References 

1951 births
American soccer players
Baltimore Blast (1980–1992) players
Chicago Sting (NASL) players
Cincinnati Kids players
Hartwick Hawks men's soccer players
Las Vegas Quicksilver players
Major Indoor Soccer League (1978–1992) players
North American Soccer League (1968–1984) indoor players
North American Soccer League (1968–1984) players
Rochester Lancers (1967–1980) players
San Diego Jaws players
San Francisco Fog (MISL) players
San Jose Earthquakes (1974–1988) players
San Diego Sockers (NASL) players
Scottish emigrants to the United States
Tampa Bay Rowdies (1975–1993) players
United States men's international soccer players
Living people
Footballers from Glasgow
Soccer players from New Jersey
Sportspeople from Bergen County, New Jersey
Teaneck High School alumni
Association football forwards